Daniel Horry (1747 – 1785) was a South Carolina politician and Revolutionary War military officer.

Horry was the commander of the South Carolina Light Dragoons, a unit of the South Carolina State Troops that was established in February 1779 to fight the British in the American Revolution.  He served as a justice of peace, member of the South Carolina General Assembly and a local commissioner.

Daniel was born in the Province of South Carolina about 1747.  His father, Daniel Huger Horry (1705-1763), was a prominent French Huguenot plantation owner who lived on the Santee River in South Carolina.  Daniel and his wife, Harriott Lucas Pinckney (1748-1830), whom he married in 1769, lived at Hampton Plantation, located north of present day McClellanville, South Carolina. Harriott Lucas Pinckney was the daughter of South Carolina Chief Justice Charles Pinckney and his wife Eliza Lucas. Daniel and Harriott had two children, Daniel and Harriott. Horry served as a member of the South Carolina General Assembly, justice of the peace, and a local commissioner.

After the South Carolina Light Dragoons, a unit of the State Troops, was established in February 1779, he served as its first and only colonel.  He took over from Major Hezekiah Maham, who was assigned another command.  His unit was involved in the following known engagements:
 May 11, 1779, Charleston Neck
 Jun. 20, 1779, Battle of Stono Ferry
 Sep. 16 - Oct. 18, 1779, Siege of Savannah in Georgia
 Feb. 22, 1780, reconnaissance of the British lines near Stono Ferry
 Mar. 6-7, 1780, Ferguson's Plantation
 Mar. 27, 1780, Rantowles Bridge
 Apr. 14, 1780, Battle of Monck's Corner

When the British army defeated American forces and occupied Charleston in 1780, Daniel took British protection to avoid seizure of his extensive properties.  In the summer of 1781, he took his young son, Daniel, to London, England to be educated.  When Charleston returned to patriot control in 1782, Daniel's estate was amerced twelve percent of its total value when Daniel returned to South Carolina.  He died there in 1785.

References

See also
 List of South Carolina militia units in the American Revolution
 Peter Horry (possible relation)

People of South Carolina in the American Revolution
1785 deaths
Huguenot participants in the American Revolution
Members of the South Carolina House of Representatives
South Carolina state senators
Year of birth uncertain